The 2010 Gay Games (Gay Games VIII) were an international multi-sport event and cultural gathering organized by, and specifically for lesbian, gay, bisexual, and transgender (LGBT) athletes, artists and musicians. It was held from July 31 to August 7, 2010 in Cologne, Germany.

Bidding process
On 16 March 2005, the Federation of Gay Games (FGG) announced that Cologne, Johannesburg, and Paris were the official candidate cities for Gay Games VIII in 2010. Cologne was elected in the FGG annual meeting in Chicago on 13 November 2005. The 2010 Games marked the first time the Games were held in Germany, and the second time in Europe (Amsterdam hosted in 1998). In the 2010 Gay Games was Sir Elton John was announced as the ambassador of the games on November 7.

Participating nations
Athletes from 70 countries participated at the 2010 Gay Games. The most athletes came from Germany (2,955), followed by the United States (2,215), the United Kingdom (841), the Netherlands (658) and France (524).

Opening ceremony
German Foreign Minister Guido Westerwelle (who was openly gay) attended the opening ceremony on 31 July 2010.

The Official Anthem for the 2010 Gay Games was "Facing a Miracle" by Taylor Dayne in which she performed live.

Also Sir Elton John was announced as an ambassador of the games on November 7.

Events 

The event featured 35 sports, accompanied by community and cultural events throughout Cologne and the surrounding area.

The 35 disciplines consisted of Badminton, Basketball, Beach-Volleyball, Bodybuilding (Physique), Bowling, Bridge, Chess, Cycling, DanceSport, Diving, Field Hockey, Figure Skating, Golf, Handball, Ice Hockey, Inline Speed Skating, Martial Arts, Pool-Billiards, Powerlifting, Road Races incl. Marathon, Sailing, Soccer (Football), Softball, Sport Climbing, Sport Shooting, Squash, Swimming, Synchronized Swimming, Table Tennis, Tennis, Track and Field Triathlon, Volleyball, Water Polo and Wrestling.

Soccer (football) had the largest participation with more than 1,000 male and female competitors.

See also 

 Federation of Gay Games, the sanctioning body of the Gay Games
 Gay Games
 LGBT rights in Germany 
 List of LGBT-related organizations

References

External links
 Gay Games VIII official Homepage (English)
 Postcard from Europe: Questioning the necessity of the Gay Games

2010
2010 in multi-sport events
2010 in German sport
Cologne
Sport in Cologne
Multi-sport events in Germany
2010 in LGBT history